José Romão Dimas (born 7 May 1930, in Almada) is a former Portuguese footballer who played as a winger.

External links 
 
 
 

1930 births
Sportspeople from Almada
Living people
Portuguese footballers
Association football wingers
Primeira Liga players
Vitória F.C. players
C.F. Os Belenenses players
Associação Naval 1º de Maio players
Portugal international footballers